Andrea Hlaváčková and Lucie Hradecká were the defending champions, but Hlaváčková chose not to participate. 
Hradecká chose to compete with Anabel Medina Garrigues and they became the new winners, after their won 6–7(2), 6–1, [10–5], against Timea Bacsinszky and Tathiana Garbin. This was the fourth straight time that Hradecká won the event in doubles, having won every time since the event's creation in 2007.

Seeds

Draw

Draw

External links
Doubles Draw

Doubles
Gastein Ladies
Gast
Gast